Eeklo is a Belgian municipality in the Flemish province of East Flanders. The municipality comprises only the town of Eeklo proper. The name Eeklo comes from the contraction of "eke" and "lo", two Old German words meaning oak and sparse woods (compare English Oakley).

History

Origins and Middle Ages
There are not many traces of early habitation in the Eeklo area. It is presumed that some oaks would have attracted the attention of travellers on the Roman road that ran along the local sandbar among the marshes. By 1240, a town had grown here and had already become important enough to warrant a civic charter by Jeanne of Constantinople, Countess of Flanders. Over the years, the marshes were drained to give place to fortified farms, some remnants of which can still be seen today (Groot Goed). Like most other cities in the County of Flanders, Eeklo's economy was based on the cloth industry, and commercial relations were established with the more powerful neighbouring cities, Ghent and Bruges.

16th century until now

During the second half of the 16th century, Eeklo was in the unfortunate position of being on the border between the Catholic south and the Protestant north, which resulted in so much destruction that the town was nearly abandoned by its inhabitants. At around that time the legend of "recooking" appeared, actually a rejuvenation recipe that involved drinking a youth elixir, cutting one's head off and baking it again. While the head was in the oven, a green cabbage took its place on the body, symbol of the empty head.

The 18th and 19th century were more favourable and the textile industry took off again. Most of the town's schools and neo-gothic buildings date from that period. Today, Eeklo is changing its vocation from an industrial town to one of services to the neighbouring communities.

Main sights
The town hall and belfry have been designated by UNESCO as a World Heritage Site in 1999.
Eeklo has a few notable churches and chapels, such as the St Vincent Church (Sint-Vincentiuskerk) and the chapel of the clinic of the Holy Heart (Heilig Hartkliniek).
A nearby provincial park, “Het Leen”, includes an arboretum and museum.
A local park, the Heldenpark, offers concerts in summer, and houses a playground for children, bowling areas for seniors, and a soccer and baseball field.

Famous inhabitants
Leon L. Van Autreve, fourth United States Sergeant Major of the Army (1920-2002)
Edouard Heene, (born 1872 in Eeklo), master builder
Erik De Vlaeminck, cyclist, 7 times world champion cyclo-cross (born 1945)
Roger De Vlaeminck, cyclist, world champion cyclo-cross in 1975, winner of 11 "Monument" classic cycle races (born 1947)
Paul Van Hyfte (born 1972 in Eeklo), cyclist
Rudy Matthijs (born 1959 in Eeklo), cyclist
Frederik Willems (born 1979 in Eeklo), cyclist
Dirk Braeckman, artist and photographer (b. 1958)
Olivier De Cock (born 1975 in Eeklo), soccer player
Maarten Martens (born 1984 in Eeklo), soccer player 
Tonny Mols (born 1969 in Eeklo), soccer player
Guido van Heulendonk (pseudonym of Guido Beelaert) (born in Eeklo), writer
Karel Lodewijk Ledeganck (born 1805 in Eeklo), writer
Peter Van de Veire (born 1971 in Eeklo), radio personality
Tom Dice (born 1989 in Eeklo), singer and songwriter, represented Belgium in Eurovision Song Contest 2010

Twin cities
 Newbury, England
 Braunfels, Germany
 Bagnols-sur-Cèze, France
 Carcaixent, Spain
 Feltre, Italy

References

External links

Official website  - Information available in Dutch and limited information available in English, French, German and Spanish.

 
Municipalities of East Flanders
World Heritage Sites in Belgium